Paar (translation: "The Crossing ") is a 1984 Indian Hindi-language film directed by Goutam Ghose and produced by Swapan Sarkar. The film stars Shabana Azmi, Naseeruddin Shah and Om Puri. Naseeruddin Shah won a Volpi Cup for his role as Naurangia. The film was based on Bengali story Paari by Samaresh Basu.

Plot 

The film of exploitation in rural Bihar, in which a landlord (Utpal Dutt)’s men wreck a village and kill the benevolent schoolmaster (Anil Chatterjee) who was a progressive force in the village. The labourer Naurangia (Naseeruddin Shah) breaks with a tradition to passive resistance and retaliates  by killing the landlord's brother. Naurangia and his wife Rama (Shabana Azmi) become fugitives from justice. After many efforts to find sustenance elsewhere, the two decide to return home. To earn the fare, they agree  to drive the herd of pigs through the river, causing the pregnant Rama to believe she has lost her baby. But they have to swim across a wide, swiftly flowing river, in which they nearly drown before reaching safety. At the end of the film Naurangia puts his ear to her belly and listens to the heartbeats of the unborn baby.

Cast 
 Naseeruddin Shah ...  Naurangia
 Shabana Azmi ... Rama
 Om Puri ... Ram Naresh (Village Pradhan)
 Utpal Dutt ... Landlord
 Anil Chatterjee ...  Schoolmaster  
 Mohan Agashe ...  Hari, Landlord's brother 
 Kamu Mukherjee ... Jute mill sardar
 Ruma Guha Thakurta ... Schoolmaster's wife
 Usha Ganguly ... Wife of a jute mill worker 
 Rupa Ganguly
 Kalyan Chatterjee
 Sunil Mukherjee ... Kolkata pavement dweller 
 Bimal Deb ... Agent of piggery

Awards and nominations

References

External links

1984 films
1980s Hindi-language films
Films featuring a Best Actress National Award-winning performance
Films directed by Goutam Ghose
Films featuring a Best Actor National Award-winning performance
Films set in Bihar
Films based on short fiction
Best Hindi Feature Film National Film Award winners
Films based on works by Samaresh Basu